Sigrid Alexandersen  (born 1995) is a Norwegian orienteering competitor. At the 2018 European Orienteering Championships in Cadempino she won a bronze medal in the sprint relay with the Norwegian team, achieved a fourth place in the women's relay, placed 13th in the sprint, and 8th in the long distance. She competed at the 2018 World Orienteering Championships in Latvia, where she qualified for the sprint final. 

Her junior achievements included a fourth place in sprint at the 2015 Junior World Orienteering Championships in Rauland.

References

Norwegian orienteers
Female orienteers
1995 births
Living people
Sportspeople from Bærum
21st-century Norwegian women